"Bang-Shang-A-Lang" is the debut single released by The Archies in 1968.  It was written and produced by Jeff Barry. The song was featured on their self-titled album. It peaked at No. 22 on the Billboard Hot 100.

Charts

Other versions
Young Blood released a version of the song as a single in 1968.
Helen Gamboa released a version of the song as a single in 1968.
Carmen Villani released an Italian version of the song as a single in 1969 entitled "Dang Dang Dang".
The Walkers released a version of the song as a single in 1970 in Denmark.

References

1968 songs
1968 singles
1969 singles
1970 singles
Songs from television series
Songs written by Jeff Barry
The Archies songs
Pye Records singles
Parlophone singles